The Little Dipper is a junior steel roller coaster located at Memphis Kiddie Park in Brooklyn, Ohio.

The coaster was built by The Allan Herschell Company and began operating in April 1952, making it the oldest continuously operating steel roller coaster from its original location in North America. It was not in operation for the Summer 2020 season, as the park was closed due to the COVID-19 pandemic shortening the season. In the 1970s, the original train was replaced with one that had silver with blue accents. For the 2006 season it was repainted red with white accents.

The coaster has one three-car train.  Riders are seated two across with two rows per car, giving the coaster a capacity of 12 riders.

References 

Roller coasters in Ohio
Buildings and structures in Cuyahoga County, Ohio
Roller coasters introduced in 1952